Norm Stephenson (1 May 1879 – 27 January 1936) was a former Australian rules footballer who played with Melbourne in the Victorian Football League (VFL).

Notes

External links 

1879 births
Australian rules footballers from Victoria (Australia)
Melbourne Football Club players
1936 deaths